South Dakota State University (SDSU) is a public land-grant research university in Brookings, South Dakota. Founded in 1881, it is the state's largest and most comprehensive university and the oldest continually-operating university in South Dakota. The university is governed by the South Dakota Board of Regents, which governs the state's six public universities and two special schools.

South Dakota State University is a land-grant university founded under the provisions of the 1862 Morrill Act. This land-grant heritage and mission has led the university to place a special focus on academic programs in agriculture, engineering, nursing, and pharmacy, as well as liberal arts. It is classified among "R2: Doctoral Universities – High research activity". The graduate program is classified as Doctoral, Science, Technology, Engineering, Math dominant.

History

The university was founded in the Dakota Territory on February 21, 1881, as Dakota Agriculture College. The first building, with funding from the territorial legislature, was built in 1883, six years before the State of South Dakota was formed. Numerous expansions were funded in the late 19th century and early 20th century. The name was changed in 1904 to South Dakota State College of Agriculture and Mechanic Arts. In 1964, the name was changed to South Dakota State University. The name change was largely promoted by the Alumni Association. Initiated in 1962, this name change reflected the more comprehensive education offered at the university.

In 1923, SDSU's instructional program was organized under five divisions: Agriculture, Engineering, General Science, Home Economics, and Pharmacy. In 1956, a Nursing program was established, and in 1957 a formal graduate school was formed. When the university changed its name in 1964, the colleges were renamed Agriculture and Biological Sciences, Arts and Sciences, Engineering, Home Economics, Nursing, Pharmacy, and the Graduate School. In 1974, the College of General Registration (now the College of General Studies) was formed. In 1975, the Division of Education was created. An Honors College was formed in 1999. Two colleges and seven departments combined in 2009 to create the College of Education and Human Sciences.

In 2017, the colleges which make up the university were revised and in some cases renamed to the following: College of Agriculture, Food and Environmental Sciences; College of Arts, Humanities and Social Sciences; College of Education and Human Sciences; College of Nursing; College of Pharmacy & Allied Health Professions; 
Graduate School; Jerome J. Lohr College of Engineering; University College; and Van D. and Barbara B. Fishback Honors College.

Presidents
On May 23, 2016 (formal inauguration held September 29, 2016), Barry H. Dunn became the 20th President of South Dakota State University.  Dunn and his wife are alumni of SDSU, and prior to becoming president, Dunn was the Dean of SDSU's College of Agriculture and Biological Sciences.

George Lilley, 1884–1886
Lewis McLouth, 1886–1896
John Heston, 1896–1903
James Chalmers, 1903–1906
Robert Slagle, 1906–1914
Ellwood Perisho, 1914–1918
Willis Johnson, 1919–1923
Charles Pugsley, 1923–1940
George Brown, 1940
Lyman Jackson, 1941–1946
Fred Leinbach, 1947–1951
John Headley, 1952–1957
H. M. Crothers, 1957–1958
Hilton Briggs, 1958–1975
Sherwood Berg, 1975–1984
Ray Hoops, 1984–1985
Robert Wagner, 1985–1997
Peggy Gordon Miller 1998–2006
David Chicoine, 2006–2016
 Barry H. Dunn, 2016–present

Campus

Main campus

The Hilton M. Briggs Library consists of more than 635,000 bound volumes, 315,000 government documents, 79,000 maps, and 1,800 journal titles (with 28,000 additional titles available online).  Within the Briggs Library is the Daschle Research Library dedicated to former U.S. Senate Majority Leader Tom Daschle (SDSU BA 1969), which houses his Congressional papers.

The University Student Union is at the center of campus and houses many amenities for both students and the public. The Union is the home to numerous meeting rooms, a ballroom, The Hobo Day Committee (homecoming committee), the University Program Council, Greek life the Students' Association, The Collegian student newspaper, Student Legal Services, KSDJ 90.7 FM, Dining Services, four eating facilities, the University Bookstore, Card Services, and International Student Affairs.

The  SDSU Wellness Center opened in the fall of 2008. The building lightens up space in the HPER Center, allowing that to be used exclusively by athletes, while the Wellness Center is used only by students and the public. Student memberships are free and Brookings community members may purchase memberships. Numerous group exercise programs and classes are offered, along with personal training. The building houses a rock climbing wall, a track, three basketball courts, a competition-size swimming pool, and numerous weights and cardiovascular equipment. It is also the home of Student Health, which includes a full pharmacy for students.

West campus

The Coughlin Campanile, formerly used as the campus bell tower, is a familiar sight around campus. The campus also has two museums, the South Dakota Art Museum (featuring works by Harvey Dunn and Oscar Howe, among others), and the South Dakota Agricultural Heritage Museum. The art museum is home to over 7,000 works of art, while the agricultural museum is home to over 100,000 objects.  Both museums are open free to the public. The university operates its own dairy plant, processing 10,000 lb (4.5 t) of milk weekly into cheese and ice cream, operates a cattle and sheep breeding operation, has an on-campus meat processing facility, and has a student-operated pharmacy.

East campus

Also close to campus are the McCrory Gardens and South Dakota Arboretum.  These gardens include a  public display and a  arboretum.  The gardens are open daily to the public.  SDSU is also home to State University Theatre and Prairie Repertory Theatre, which produce numerous plays and musicals during the school year and summer breaks.

Academics
SDSU awards associate degrees, bachelor's degrees, master's degrees, and doctoral degrees. The university provides 175 fields of study.  The university's colleges and schools include College of Agriculture, Food and Environmental Sciences; College of Arts, Humanities and Social Sciences; College of Education and Human Sciences; College of Nursing; College of Pharmacy & Allied Health Professions; Graduate School; Jerome J. Lohr College of Engineering; University College; and Van D. and Barbara B. Fishback Honors College.

The following accreditations have been awarded to SDSU:
 College of Agriculture, Food and Environmental Sciences: AAVLD, ASABE, SRM
 College of Arts, Humanities and Social Sciences: ACEJMC, NAACLS, NASM
 College of Education and Human Sciences: ACEND, AABI, CAATE, CoAES, CIDA, CACREP, CORE, NAEYC, NCATE, SD Department of Education
 Jerome J. Lohr College of Engineering: ABET, ACCE
 College of Nursing: SD Board of Nursing, CCNE
 College of Pharmacy & Allied Health Professions: ACPE

Rankings

For 2021, U.S. News & World Report rated South Dakota State University as tied for the 144th best public university in the United States and tied as the 284th best university overall.

Awards and Rankings. South Dakota State University.

Political Science Department

SDSU's Department of Political Science has been successful at producing many of the state's current and past congressional delegations. Currently, two of South Dakota's three congressional members are alumni in U.S. Senator Mike Rounds and Governor of South Dakota Kristi Noem. Noem completed her political science degree while she was in Congress. Perhaps the most notable of the program is former U.S. Senate Majority Leader Tom Daschle. Former U.S. Representative Stephanie Herseth has served as a professor of the program. The department produced two Truman Scholars in 2004 and 2006 respectively, including Tony Venhuizen.

Department of Military Science
The Department of Military Science commissions officers into the military. The department's cadets complete the requirements for a bachelor's or graduate degree and are then commissioned as second lieutenants.

The department has been successful in producing many U.S. Generals including William E. DePuy, Jake Krull, Raymond W. Carpenter, Franklin J. Blaisdell, Mark A. Clark, as well as Medal of Honor recipients Leo K. Thorsness and Willibald C. Bianchi.

Research achievements
South Dakota State University currently ranks among the Midwest's top research universities, notably in the fields of agricultural science, biological science, and engineering. It is consistently listed in U.S. News & World Reports "Top 200 National Universities" in its college and university rankings.
The campus is also home to the Geospatial Sciences Center of Excellence, a research and educational collaboration with United States Geological Survey Center for Earth Resources Observation and Science. The GSCE focuses on basic and applied research in terrestrial remote sensing. SDSU was recognized in 2017 by ShanghaiRanking Consultancy as the seventh most productive university in the US (and 27th globally) for remote sensing research for the period 2011–2015.

The university operates the South Dakota state agricultural research stations around the state, such as the Antelope Range and Livestock Research Station near Buffalo.
The Great Plains Writers Conference is a venue for significant regional authors or writers interested in the Great Plains. It was instituted at SDSU in 1976 for writing scholarship.

Alumni from the university's research community notable for scientific achievements include:
 Stephen Foster Briggs, B.S. 1907, invented the Briggs & Stratton internal-combustion engine 
 Theodore Schultz, B.S. Economics & Agriculture 1928, received the 1979 Nobel Prize in Economics
 Paul Middaugh, B.S., established the nation's first on-campus research facility for ethanol fuel production in 1979 
 Gene Amdahl, B.S. Engineering & Physics, 1948, developed the IBM 360 computer and later the IBM 704, IBM 709 computers, and Amdahl's Law
 Aelred Kurtenbach and Duane Sander, electrical engineering professors, founded Daktronics, Inc.
 Carrie Buthe, B.S. Civil Engineering, served as a design engineer for the Lewis and Clark Regional Water System.

Online programs
SDSU offers a variety of online programs. The university offers associate degrees, bachelor's degrees, master's degrees, and certificate programs that students can complete online.

Housing and residential life

Students have a variety of residential hall and apartment living choices.  Student housing is located in three areas:  the Medary complex located in the northwest corner of campus, consisting of traditional residence halls, Hansen, and apartment-style living at Meadows North and Meadows South; the Grove complex near the Student Union, consisting of traditional residence halls, Brown, Mathews and Pierson, as well as a newer (2010) variation on the theme of traditional residence halls in Spencer, Thorne and Abbott (also called the Jackrabbit Village); and the Larson complex on the east side of campus, consisting of traditional halls Binnewies and Young and suite living at Caldwell Hall. The residential halls on the campus of SDSU make up the densest concentration of people in South Dakota.

All of the residence halls with the exceptions of Caldwell and both Meadows buildings are co-ed by wing, with each wing having its own bathroom.  Caldwell Hall is suite style, meaning two rooms share a common bathroom for the four occupants and each floor on Caldwell is co-ed.  The Meadows North and Meadows South apartment complexes feature four-bedroom apartments.

Some residence halls have a Living/Learning Community, where an entire floor is composed of a certain group of students.  Examples include Agriculture and Biology Majors, Honors College, Engineering/ Learning Community, Health Professionals Living/Learning Community and Substance-Free housing.

Ben Reifel Hall, Hyde, Theodore Schultz Hall and the Honors Hall (collectively, the Jackrabbit Grove) opened in the fall of 2013. Schultz Hall is home of the Wellness Living/Learning Community and the Honors Hall, as the name suggests, is home to the Honors College. They are similar in amenities to the Jackrabbit Village halls (Spencer, Thorne and Abbott).

The most recent addition to the dormitories was the Southeast University Neighborhood, located on the corner of 8th Street and 16th Avenue. These buildings are intended for juniors, seniors and graduate students, and are thus more similar to regular apartments, with full kitchens, furniture, and summer storage, even a Starbucks attached. Nearby are the Townhouses, which are similar to the Neighborhood apartments, but also allow pets and do not require meal plans.

Greek societies
This list contains only social fraternities that are a part of either the Interfraternity Council or the College Panhellenic Association. Other fraternities and sororities exist as general student organizations.
Alpha Gamma Rho (ΑΓΡ)
Alpha Omega Epsilon (ΑΩΕ)
Alpha Xi Delta (ΑΞΔ)
Ceres
Chi Omega (ΧΩ)
Delta Chi (ΔΧ)
FarmHouse (FH)
Lambda Chi Alpha (ΛΧΑ)
Pi Kappa Alpha (ΠΚΑ)
Sigma Alpha Epsilon (ΣΑΕ)
Sigma Phi Delta (ΣΦΔ)
Sigma Phi Epsilon (ΣΦΕ)

Student life

The SDSU Marching Band, "The Pride of the Dakotas", given the special name the Millennium Band in 2000 by the South Dakota State Legislature, has marched in the 1981 and 1997 Presidential Inaugural Parades in Washington, D.C.; A Capital Fourth in 2000 in Washington, D.C., which was broadcast on PBS; the 2003 and 2008 Tournament of Roses Parade in Pasadena, California, making them the second collegiate band in the history of the Rose Bowl to be invited to march twice when their team was not competing; and the Korean War Monument Dedication at the state's capital Pierre in 2004, in the company of two other college bands and 60-some high school bands from across the state. The homecoming celebration, Hobo Day, is "The Biggest One-Day Event in the Dakotas."

Athletics

SDSU participates in athletics as a member of NCAA Division I. SDSU's athletic conference affiliations include the Summit League for most sports, the Missouri Valley Football Conference (Division I FCS), the Big 12 Conference (wrestling) and Varsity Equestrian. The Jackrabbits have 19 varsity sports and numerous intramural and club teams. South Dakota State's athletic mascot for both the men's and women's teams is the Jackrabbit, both the men's and women's sports teams are officially referred to as the Jackrabbits.

Men's basketball
 

Division II national champions in 1963, the Jackrabbits have had one of the most successful mid-major programs in the nation since joining the ranks of Division I. SDSU has won at least a share of the Summit League regular season title in seven of the past nine seasons, including each of the last four. The Jackrabbits have won five conference tournaments, qualifying for the NCAA Division I Tournament in 2012, 2013, 2016, 2017 and 2018. During that run, two all-Americans have shone for the Jackrabbits – Nate Wolters and Mike Daum. Additionally, Wolters is one of seven State alums who have been selected in the NBA Draft. Since 2012, no Division I men's basketball program has won a greater percentage of its home games than South Dakota State.

Women's basketball

Head coach Aaron Johnston took over the program at the beginning of the new century and women's basketball at SDSU was never the same. The Jackrabbits reached the NCAA Elite Eight in each of their final three seasons in Division II, winning the national championship in 2003. After becoming the first school transitioning to Division I to earn a postseason bid, playing in the WNIT in both 2007 and 2008, SDSU turned its focus to dominating the Summit League. The Jacks have won nine of the 13 conference tournaments they have played in. The program has played in ten NCAA Division I Tournaments, winning four games, highlighted by a trip to the Sweet Sixteen in 2018. The program also won first-round games in 2009 and 2015. Macy Miller led the program to three of those four victories en route to becoming the school's all-time scoring leader. She was selected in the second round of the 2018 WNBA Draft.

Men's football

As of December 10, 2022, the Jackrabbits have appeared in the NCAA Division I FCS playoffs 12 times with an overall record of 16-11, with the 2022 season still to be completed. They were in the Championship game May 20, 2021, losing 23–21 to Sam Houston State. The Jackrabbits were semifinalists in 2017, 2018, and 2021. SDSU has an active streak of 11 consecutive postseason appearances at the FCS level, including the appearance in 2022. All of this was accomplished by John Stiegelmeier, the school's winningest head coach, after the program managed only one Division II playoff appearance (1979). Zach Zenner became the first Division I football player to record three consecutive seasons of 2,000 rushing yards (2012–14). The program's national standing persuaded ESPN's College Gameday television show to come to the Brookings campus for a live broadcast of its show on October 26, 2019.  The Jackrabbits won their first FCS National Championship following the 2022 season.

Dana Dykhouse buildings and facilities

 A 19,340-capacity stadium opened in the fall of 2016. It is considered among the premier FCS Division I stadiums.

The Dykhouse Student-Athlete Center, located on the north end of the Dana J. Dykhouse Stadium, is the home of Jackrabbit football. It opened prior to the 2010 football season and houses an academic center equipped with study areas, computers, tutors and other educational aids for all South Dakota State teams.
The Sanford Jackrabbit Athlete Complex, a state-of-the-art indoor practice and competition facility, opened October 11, 2014. It is immediately north of and attached to the Dykhouse Student-Athlete Center. The SJAC has bleacher seating for up to 1,000 spectators and can be used for track practice and track meets, football practice, softball and baseball practice, golf practice and other events within the SDSU athletic department. It includes 149,284-square foot facility and features an eight-lane, 300-meter track, one of only five collegiate indoor tracks of that size in the nation.

Notable alumni

South Dakota State University has produced a number of the current members of South Dakota's state government and in Congress, including Kristi Noem, the state's first female governor and a former U.S. representative, and current U.S. Senator Mike Rounds. Members of the South Dakota Supreme Court, former Chief Justice David Gilbertson and current Associate Justice Mark Salter, attended the university for their undergraduate degrees. David Gilbertson was the longest serving state Supreme Court chief justice, serving 19 years until retiring in 2021.

In the federal cabinet, Stephen Censky, former United States Deputy Secretary of Agriculture, and in federal foreign service, former Governor of South Dakota Dick Kneip served as United States Ambassador to Singapore. Among alumni who are political figures are seven members of Congress, most notably Majority Leader of the United States Senate, Tom Daschle and first Lakota American Indian member of Congress Ben Reifel. Alumni of South Dakota State have occupied top positions in Wall Street and the rest of the business world, including CEO of Kuwait Petroleum Corporation, Nizar Al-Adsani. In science and technology, alumni include IBM 360 inventor Gene Amdahl, "father of Amdahl's law", and Nobel laureate Theodore Schultz, "father of Human Capital Theory."

Academia, science, and technology
John Merton Aldrich (1888), zoologist, entomologist and curator of insects at the United States National Museum
Stephen Foster Briggs (1907), inventor of the Briggs & Stratton engine
Theodore Schultz (1928), economist, Nobel laureate, 1979 Nobel Prize in Economics, and chair of Chicago School of Economics
Irwin Gunsalus, discovered lipoic acid, founder of United Nations International Center for Genetic Engineering and Biotechnology, and chair of National Academy of Sciences
Robert H. Burris (1936), National Academy of Sciences Professor of Biochemistry at the University of Wisconsin–Madison
Cleveland L. Abbott, professor and coach of Tuskegee University and namesake of Tuskegee's Abbott Memorial Alumni Stadium
Gene Amdahl (1948), Architect of the IBM 360, IBM 704, IBM 709, and Amdahl's Law
John Mortvedt (1953), soils scientist
Vern L. Schramm (1963), Professor of Biochemistry at the Albert Einstein College of Medicine
Roger Zwieg (1964), NASA astronaut and flight instructor
Cynthia Larive (1980), current Chancellor of the University of California, Santa Cruz
Josephine Santiago-Bond (2005), Chief of the Advanced Engineering Development Branch at National Aeronautics and Space Administration

Arts and literature
Harvey Dunn (1902), painter
Jeanine Basinger (1958), film historian
James Pollock (1965), abstract and landscape artist
Kang-i Sun Chang (1972), Chair of East Asian Languages and Literature at Yale University

Business
Nizar Al-Adsani (1983), CEO of Kuwait Petroleum Corporation
Leif Fixen, Pacific Northwest Conservation Program Manager for American Farmland Trust
Jerry Lohr, founder and owner of J. Lohr Vineyards and Wines
Dana J. Dykhouse, President of First Premier Bank

Government
Philo Hall (1886), U.S. Representative from South Dakota and sixth Attorney General of South Dakota
Clarence C. Caldwell (1902), ninth Attorney General of South Dakota
Sigurd Anderson, 19th Governor and Attorney General of South Dakota
Ben Reifel (1932), U.S. Representative from South Dakota, first Lakota Indian member of Congress
Francis G. Dunn (1935), Chief Justice, South Dakota Supreme Court
Andrew Wendell Bogue (1941), Chief Judge, United States District Court for the District of South Dakota
Gordon Mydland (1944), 23rd Attorney General of South Dakota
Richard F. Kneip (1945), sixth United States Ambassador to the Republic of Singapore and 25th Governor of South Dakota
William Dougherty (1954), Lieutenant Governor of South Dakota
Frank Denholm (1956), U.S. Representative from South Dakota
Kermit A. Sande (1964), 24th Attorney General of South Dakota
Tom Daschle (1969), United States Majority Leader of the United States Senate and U.S. Representative from South Dakota
Larry Long (1969), 29th Attorney General of South Dakota
Randy Seiler, 41st United States Attorney for the District of South Dakota
Alan Lance (1971), 31st Attorney General of Idaho, Judge of the United States Court of Appeals for Veterans Claims, and National Commander of The American Legion
David Gilbertson (1972), former Chief Justice, South Dakota Supreme Court
Mike Rounds (1976), current U.S. Senator from South Dakota and 31st Governor of South Dakota
Stephen Censky (1981), current United States Deputy Secretary of Agriculture
Carole Hillard (1982), Lieutenant Governor of South Dakota
Kristie Fiegen (1984), Chairwoman of South Dakota Public Utilities Commission
Gregory J. Stoltenburg (1984), current presiding judge, Third Circuit Court of South Dakota
Mark Salter (1990), current Associate Justice of the South Dakota Supreme Court
Jason Frerichs (2007), former South Dakota Senate Minority Leader
Kristi Noem (2012), U.S. Representative from South Dakota; first female Governor of South Dakota
Charles Abourezk, current Chief Justice, Rosebud Sioux Tribe Supreme Court

Military
Willibald C. Bianchi (1939), World War II veteran and Medal of Honor recipient
William E. DePuy (1941), U.S. Army General and first commander of TRADOC
Leo K. Thorsness (1953), U.S. Air Force Colonel, Medal of Honor recipient; Washington state senator 
Jake Krull (1960), U.S. General; South Dakota state senator 
Raymond W. Carpenter (1970), U.S. Major General of the United States Army, Director of the Army National Guard
Franklin J. Blaisdell (1971), U.S. Air Force General
Mark A. Clark (1980), U.S. Major General of United States Marine Corps
Gregory J. Stoltenburg (1984), U.S. Lieutenant Colonel

Sports
Paul Miller (1936), NFL halfback and NFL Champion
Mark Barber (1937), NFL fullback 
Paul Ellering, professional wrestling manager
Jon Madsen, NCAA Wrestling National Champion, mixed martial artist
Doug Eggers (1955), NFL linebacker 
Pete Retzlaff (1956), NFL player, 5× Pro-bowler and president of the NFL Players Association
Tom Black (1964), NBA center 
Wayne Rasmussen (1964), NFL safety 
Jim Langer (1970), NFL center, Pro Football Hall of Fame inductee, and 2× Super Bowl Champion
Lynn Boden (1975), NFL guard
Brad Seely (1978), NFL special teams coach
Steve Lingenfelter (1981), NBA forward
Rod DeHaven (1991), 2000 Olympic Marathoner and 2000 U.S. Olympic Trials Champion
Doug Miller (1993), NFL linebacker 
Adam Vinatieri (1996), NFL kicker and 4× Super Bowl Champion
Adam Timmerman (1995), NFL guard, 2× Pro-Bowler, and 2× Super Bowl Champion
Steve Heiden (1999), NFL tight end and special teams coach
Josh Ranek (2002), CFL running back
Parker Douglass (2009), NFL placekicker 
JaRon Harris (2009), NFL wide receiver
Danny Batten (2010), NFL defensive end 
Colin Cochart (2011), NFL tight end 
Dale Moss (2012), professional football wide receiver; one of the winners of the 16th season of ABC's The Bachelorette
Tyler Oakes (2012), college baseball coach
Nate Wolters (2013), NBA guard 
Zach Zenner (2014), NFL running back 
Dallas Goedert (2018), NFL tight end 
Jake Wieneke (2018), professional football wide receiver
Pierre Strong Jr. (2021), NFL running back

References

External links

South Dakota State Athletics website

 
Public universities and colleges in South Dakota
Land-grant universities and colleges
Educational institutions established in 1881
Education in Brookings County, South Dakota
Buildings and structures in Brookings, South Dakota
Tourist attractions in Brookings County, South Dakota
1881 establishments in Dakota Territory